Wiggers is a German and Dutch patronymic surname. The given name Wigger is a form of the Germanic Wichard, from Wîh- ("battle") and -hard ("strong"). Variant spelling include Wichers and Wiggerts. People with this surname include

Carl J. Wiggers (1883–1963), American physiologist
Wiggers diagram, a cardiac physiology diagram he devised
Charles Wiggers (fl. 1920), Belgian racewalker
Dirceu Wiggers de Oliveira Filho (born 1988), Brazilian football defender
Friedrich Heinrich Wiggers (1746–1811), German botanist
Heinrich August Ludwig Wiggers (1803–1880), German pharmacist
Hermann Wiggers (1880–1968), German football defender
 (1811–1901), German theologist
Ketlen Wiggers (born 1992), Brazilian football forward
Lone Wiggers (born 1963), Danish architect
Martin H. Wiggers (born 1963), German economist, editor, author and businessman
Michaël Wiggers (born 1980), Belgian football defender
Moritz Wiggers (1816–1894), German lawyer and revolutionary
Namita Gupta Wiggers (born 1967), American contemporary craft expert, curator and writer
Thais Souza Wiggers (born 1985), Brazilian television presenter and model
 (born 1987), Dutch long distance runner
Wichers
Edward Wichers (1892–1984), American chemist
 (1902–1990), Dutch writer known as "Belcampo"
 (1887–1956), Dutch composer of marches
Otto Wichers (born 1981), Dutch singer-songwriter
Peter Wichers (born 1979), Swedish heavy metal bass guitarist

See also
Wigger (disambiguation), including people with the surname Wigger
Wiegers, surname of the same origin

References

German-language surnames
Dutch-language surnames
Patronymic surnames